Elvin Chia Tshun Thau (born 26 April 1977) is a retired Malaysian swimmer. He was born in Sandakan, Sabah. He was the Malaysian Olympian of the Year in 1999. He also competed at the Summer Olympic Games: 1996 and 2000.

References

1977 births
Living people
People from Sandakan
Malaysian male breaststroke swimmers
Olympic swimmers of Malaysia
Swimmers at the 1996 Summer Olympics
Swimmers at the 2000 Summer Olympics
Commonwealth Games competitors for Malaysia
Swimmers at the 1998 Commonwealth Games
Asian Games medalists in swimming
Swimmers at the 1998 Asian Games
Swimmers at the 2002 Asian Games
Asian Games bronze medalists for Malaysia
Medalists at the 1998 Asian Games
Southeast Asian Games medalists in swimming
Southeast Asian Games gold medalists for Malaysia
Southeast Asian Games silver medalists for Malaysia
Southeast Asian Games bronze medalists for Malaysia
Competitors at the 1995 Southeast Asian Games